Douglas Thollar (13 February 1919 – 14 June 2005) was an Australian cricketer. He played three first-class matches for Tasmania between 1936 and 1939.

See also
 List of Tasmanian representative cricketers

References

External links
 

1919 births
2005 deaths
Australian cricketers
Tasmania cricketers
Cricketers from Tasmania